The Korean Methodist Church is a large Methodist denomination in South Korea and the rest of the world, with approximately 1.5 million members. Methodist missionaries came from the United States in the late 19th century. It became independent in 1930, and celebrated its centennial in 1984. The denomination has ties with its mother church, the United Methodist Church.

References

Further reading
 

Methodism in South Korea
Methodist denominations established in the 20th century
Christian organizations established in 1930